The Vermosa Sports Hub is a sports facility situated in the city of Imus in Cavite, Philippines.

History
The facility was opened to the public in March 2018. Prior to its opening, member of the Philippine national track and field team is already using the facility in preparation for the 2018 Asian Games.

On November 6, 2018, the football field of the sports complex hosted an unofficial friendly between the Philippine and Mongolia national football teams  which ended in a 3-1 win for the hosts. The sports complex's swimming pool will host the underwater hockey competitions of the 2019 Southeast Asian Games.

Facilities
The Vermosa Sports Hub host the first  nine lane athletics oval in the Philippines. It is also the only oval certified by the International Association of Athletics Federations (IAAF). It also host a  swimming pool which has certification from FINA.

As of June 2018, a grandstand and more seats are yet to be built along the track oval. Billeting areas for athletes are also to be built to enable the facility to host events and competitions.

References

Athletics (track and field) venues in the Philippines
Football venues in the Philippines
Sports venues completed in 2018
Buildings and structures in Imus
Sports complexes in the Philippines